Renia rigida is a litter moth of the family Erebidae. It is found in North America, including Iowa, Utah and Arizona.

External links
Butterflies and Moths of North America
Moths of south-eastern Arizona

Herminiinae
Moths described in 1905